Everett Joseph Fagan (January 13, 1918 – February 16, 1983) was an American professional baseball player during the 1940s.

His career extended from 1940–1943 and 1946–1947, with two full seasons missed due to United States Army service during World War II.  He was a successful minor league hurler who won 53 of 82 decisions (.646), including a 20–12 record and a 2.51 earned run average for the Pulaski Counts of the Class C Virginia League in 1942.

However, during his two Major League stints (which included all of the 1946 season), he lost seven of nine decisions (including both of his 1943 starting assignments), allowing 88 hits and 38 bases on balls, with 21 strikeouts, in 82 innings pitched.

References

External links

1918 births
1983 deaths
Baseball players from New Jersey
Birmingham Barons players
Harrisonburg Turks players
Major League Baseball pitchers
People from Tewksbury Township, New Jersey
Philadelphia Athletics players
Pulaski Counts players
Savannah Indians players
Sportspeople from Hunterdon County, New Jersey
Wilmington Blue Rocks (1940–1952) players
United States Army personnel of World War II